Christiane Weber is a German rower.

References 
 

Living people
German female rowers
Year of birth missing (living people)
World Rowing Championships medalists for West Germany
World Rowing Championships medalists for Germany